

Events
Five Points Gang member James T. "Biff" Ellison is sentenced to Sing Sing Prison for the attempted murder of gang leader Paul Kelly. He dies several years later in an insane asylum. 
Jack Zelig is arrested for robbing a bordello.  The charges are later dropped.  However, in an attempt to gain leadership of the Eastman Gang, lieutenants Jack Sirocco and Chick Tricker refuse to post bail, beginning a gang war between the two factions. 
Nathan Kaplan severely injures Johnny Spanish in a knife fight before police arrive to break up the fight. Kaplan also fights Jacob Orgen later that year giving a scar across Orgen's face before the fight is stopped. 
Filippo "John 'Handsome Johnny' Roselli" Sacco arrives with his family in the United States, from Sicily. 
Frank Tieri emigrates to the United States from Castel Gandolfo, Italy. 
Salvatore Sabella lands in the US and soon takes control of the Philadelphia Mafia.
December 1 – "Big" Jim O'Leary sells off his gambling operations and other business interests and goes into retirement. 
December 2 – Julie Morrell, an assassin hired by Sirocco and Tricker to murder Zelig, is lured to a Second Avenue nightclub and killed.

Births
Philip Lombardo, (Miami) Genovese crime family leader 
May 1 – Anthony Salerno "Fat Tony", Genovese crime family Don
November 4 – James Napoli "Jimmy Nap", Genovese crime family member involved in illegal gambling and loansharking

Deaths
December 2 – Julie Morrell, Eastman Gang member

References 

Organized crime
Years in organized crime